Damjan Petek (born 19 March 1973) is a Slovenian judoka.

Achievements

References

1973 births
Living people
Slovenian male judoka
Mediterranean Games silver medalists for Slovenia
Mediterranean Games medalists in judo
Competitors at the 1997 Mediterranean Games
21st-century Slovenian people